Suži is a neighbourhood in the Vidzeme Suburb and Northern District of Riga, the capital of Latvia. It is served by Rīgas Satiksme busses #11 and #19.

Neighbourhoods in Riga